Jordan William Zimmerman (born April 28, 1975) is a Canadian former professional baseball pitcher. 

He played part of one season in Major League Baseball for the Seattle Mariners in 1999, then later also pitched for the Long Island Ducks of the Atlantic League of Professional Baseball in 2004.

Zimmerman was originally drafted by the Los Angeles Dodgers in 1993 in the 32nd round, 886th overall. He then re-entered the draft in 1994 and was picked by the Seattle Mariners in the 32nd round, 889th overall. 

Zimmerman appeared in 12 games, including once against his brother Jeff Zimmerman, ending his career with a no decision in every appearance he made. He had an ERA of 7.88 in only 8 innings pitched.

After his playing career ended, Zimmerman became involved in real estate sales in Arizona.

References

External links

Baseball Gauge
Retrosheet
Venezuelan Professional Baseball League

1975 births
Arizona League Mariners players
Baseball people from British Columbia
Blinn Buccaneers baseball players
Canadian expatriate baseball players in the United States
Canadian people of German descent
Cardenales de Lara players
Canadian expatriate baseball players in Venezuela
Everett AquaSox players
Lancaster JetHawks players
Living people
Long Island Ducks players
Major League Baseball pitchers
Major League Baseball players from Canada
New Haven Ravens players
Omaha Royals players
People from Brenham, Texas
Seattle Mariners players
Sportspeople from Kelowna
Tacoma Rainiers players
Wisconsin Timber Rattlers players